Heoeugorna is a genus of moths of the family Erebidae. The genus was erected by George Hampson in 1924.

Species
Heoeugorna alboarcuata (Bethune-Baker, 1906) New Guinea
Heoeugorna flavicincta Hampson, 1926 Sumatra, Peninsular Malaysia, Borneo
Heoeugorna ochrovittata (Pagenstecher, 1894) Java, Bali, Peninsular Malaysia, Singapore, Borneo

References

Calpinae